Iser Kuperman, sometimes spelled Koeperman, (April 21, 1922 - March 6, 2006) was a player of international draughts from the USSR. He had been the seven-time world champion, the four-time Panamerican champion, and multiple USSR champion in international and Russian draughts. He was also an International Grandmaster.

Career 
Iser Kuperman was born in Habne, Ukrainian SSR (now Poliske, Kiev Oblast) on April 21, 1922 to a Jewish family. In 1945, he made his debut in the USSR Russian draughts championship and won first place. After that, Kuperman took first place three times. Then he began to play in international draughts and was USSR champion five times. Iser Kuperman was world champion in 1958, 1959, 1961, 1963, 1965, 1967, and 1974. He emigrated to Israel and then to the United States in 1978. After his emigration, any mention of him was purged from Soviet records.

After that, he became a Panamerican champion (1983, 1985, 1987 and 1995), a US champion in pool checkers, and won in their "Top Master" division from 1984 to 1990. This led him to be referred to as "The Greatest Pool Checkers Player of All Time" by the Homan Square Pool Checkers & Chess Club of Chicago.

Web source

References

Dutch newspaper NRC Handelsblad 7 March 2006

Ukrainian draughts players
Soviet draughts players
Pool checkers players
1922 births
2006 deaths
Players of international draughts
People from Poliske
Players of Russian draughts
Sportspeople from Kyiv Oblast